The Bakassi Boys are a group of Nigerian youth vigilantes in the south-eastern region of Nigeria. Activities of the vigilante group include targeting perpetrators of robberies, ritual killings, kidnapping, such as in the case of Eddy Nawgu, an alleged prophet and occultist whom they killed and beheaded.

The Bakassi Boys are usually armed with machetes and guns, and wear an array of black magic artifacts and Juju around their body. They operate in the Igbo areas of Nigeria and have been accused of extrajudicial killings of suspected petty thieves, armed robbers, ritual killers, murderers, corrupt persons, and generally anyone they considered evil. The manner in which they determined if one was evil or not was allegedly by the use of dark magic, in which they placed a silver-colored machete on the chest of any suspicious person, and if the machete's color changed from silver to blood red it meant the person had committed a heinous crime at some point in their life, and such a person would be killed immediately.

In the south-eastern part of Nigeria, especially Anambra State, they still enjoy popular support in the areas where they operate because certain problems in the region have greatly decreased since the inception of the vigilante group in 1998. According to publications by various Nigerian media houses, they had an alleged magical immunity to gunshots - even when shot multiple times at close range,  they allegedly wouldn't flinch nor sustain any injuries. This metaphysical power was referred to as Odeshi amongst the Igbo people of Nigeria.  Odeshi is an Igbo word that means "It does not leak" or "it would not leak", which meant if anyone shot them with a gun it wouldn't pierce their skins, hence their blood would not leak.

The Bakassi Boys have now rebranded and are now Anambra Vigilante Services and have reduced their activities significantly.

History
These groups took their name from the Bakassi peninsula, an oil-rich peninsula in the Annang-Efik-Ibibio region of the coastal south-eastern Nigeria. The Bakassi Boys emerged as a vigilante group simultaneously with sharp increases in the crime rate of Abia State.

They originally enjoyed the support of the governor, Orji Uzor Kalu. He appreciated the effectiveness of the group in combating the crimes in Aba and environs. However, as the crime rate was going down in Aba, other eastern Igbo cities' crime rates remained the same, and the crime rates in some places, including Onitsha, were still rising. The Bakassi Boys then were invited to other major cities, including Onitsha and Owerri, to rid them of criminals.

In time, law enforcement agencies became regarded as ineffective in the region, and the Bakassi endeared themselves to many Igbo traders and merchants. However, political opponents of some governors accused the group of extrajudicial killings and accused governors of using the Bakassi Boys as weapons of intimidation. As a result of heightened opposition, the group has attempted to rebrand itself as Anambra State Vigilante Services.

In media
A film titled Issakaba, an anagram for Bakassi, was produced in the year 2000 by Lancelot Oduwa Imasuen, and it depicted the origin of the vigilante group and their encounter with Eddy Nawgu.

See also 
Oodua Peoples Congress 
Amotekun

References

Osita Agbu, Ethnic Militias and the Threat to Democracy in Post-Transition Nigeria, Nordic African Institute, 2004
BBC, Gang Rule in Nigeria
Gamji.com, The Truth About the Bakassi Boys
Human Rights Watch, The Bakassi Boys: The Legitimization of Murder and Torture
Harry Nwana,Who are Bakassi Boys, Vanguard, December 28, 2000

Counterterrorism in Nigeria
Rebel groups in Nigeria
Law enforcement in Nigeria
Vigilantes
Street gangs
Gangs in Nigeria